Lt. Col. Salath Rasasack (born April 10, 1934) is a former Laotian politician who was held as a political prisoner at a concentration camp (5 A, 5 B) in Laos for over 16 years. He was released in 1991 after Amnesty International negotiated on his behalf. He is a former Senator of the Lao Government.

Early life and political career
Rasasack was born on April 10, 1934, in Savannakhet, Laos. Rasasack has a Buddhist lineage and was a name given to shoe cleaners. Rasasack was educated at the College of Savannakhet. He furthered his education in police training in Chalon -Sur- Saône and Saint-Cyr-au-Mont d'Or, France. Rasasack was elected as Congressman for the Province of Saravane, Laos. Thereafter, he was elected as Minister and Senator to the Two-Party Coalition Assembly.

Detainment
Prior to his life as a Senator, Rasasack was a Police Commissioner for the Royal Lao Government. He disappeared in 1975 after he was summoned by the President of the Coalition Assembly for a meeting. This was the last contact Rasasack had with his family and friends. While he was in the concentration camp, Rasasack lived in fear of losing his life as other political prisoners were being systematically executed. Rasasack also suffered physical and psychological abuse by the prison officials. Many political prisoners did not live to tell their stories of abuse and torture at the hands of the communist regime.

Release
It was learned that Amnesty International's Japanese chapter negotiated Salath Rasasack's release from the political prison after 16 years. On November 13, 1991, Rasasack was reunited with his family, wife Chansouk Manibod Rasasack (daughter of Phagna Tha Manibod-former Chief Justice for the Kingdom of Laos, former Mayor and Governor of Laos), sons, Salysanh Rasasack(deceased), Souksanh Rasasack, Sacksith Rasasack and daughter, Soukhy Mont d'Or Rasasack Clark (former Miss Memphis Lao Sport, 1987). Clark was approximately 4 years old when her father was taken to a political concentration camp. The majority of the Rasasacks currently reside in Memphis, Tennessee. The day Salath Rasasack arrived at the Memphis International Airport, over 150 people arrived to meet and welcome Rasasack to a life of freedom. Upon his arrival, Rasasack brought along a prison blanket. When asked by the reporters as to the significance of the blanket, Rasasack, shared that it had been his security blanket for over 16 years.

References

 Thomas, William (November 11, 1991)"Years of anxiety merge into a day of joy as family awaits ex-Laotian Prisoner", Retrieved, February 13, 2014. The Commercial Appeal, Memphis, TN.
 Keeter, Terry (November 12, 1991)"Family's joy put on hold as Laotian misses flight", Retrieved, February 13, 2014. The Commercial Appeal, Memphis, TN.
 Thomas, William (November 13, 1991)"Laotian greeted by friends, freedom", Retrieved, February 13, 2014. The Commercial Appeal, Memphis, TN.
 www.laoalliance.org
 rlge.org/ICC.htm

Laotian politicians
1934 births
Living people